The Majestic Star II (formerly known as the Trump Casino) was a floating casino that operated from 1996 to 2021 in Gary, Indiana. Located in Gary's Buffington Harbor, it overlooked Lake Michigan.

The casino was opened in 1996 by New York-based Trump Hotels & Casino Resorts, which operated an adjoining Trump hotel.

In December 2005, the Trump Organization sold the casino and hotel to Majestic Star Holdings, which operated the Majestic Star Casino next door.

Majestic Star closed both casinos in April 2021. One license was transferred to the Hard Rock Casino Northern Indiana, located inland in Gary.

References 
 

Casinos in Indiana
Culture of Gary, Indiana
Riverboat casinos
Tourist attractions in Lake County, Indiana
1996 establishments in Indiana
Casinos completed in 1996
Companies that filed for Chapter 11 bankruptcy in 2009